"Ave Maria" is a popular and much-recorded setting of the Latin prayer Ave Maria, originally published in 1853 as "". The piece consists of a melody by the French Romantic composer Charles Gounod that he superimposed over an only very slightly changed version of Bach's Prelude No. 1 in C major, BWV 846, from Book I of his The Well-Tempered Clavier, 1722. The 1853 publication has French text, but it is the 1859 version with the Latin Ave Maria which became popular.

History 
Gounod improvised the melody, and his future father-in-law Pierre-Joseph-Guillaume Zimmermann transcribed the improvisation and in 1853 made an arrangement for violin (or cello) with piano and harmonium. The same year it appeared with the words of Alphonse de Lamartine's poem Le livre de la vie ("The Book of Life"). In 1859, Jacques-Léopold Heugel published a version with the familiar Latin text. The version of Bach's prelude used by Gounod includes the "Schwencke measure" (m.23), a measure allegedly added by Christian Friedrich Gottlieb Schwencke in an attempt to correct what he or someone else erroneously deemed a "faulty" progression, even though this sort of progression was standard in Bach's music.

Alongside Schubert's "Ave Maria", the Bach/Gounod "Ave Maria" has become a fixture at funerals, wedding Masses, and quinceañeras. There are many different instrumental arrangements including for violin and guitar, string quartet, piano solo, cello, and even trombones. Opera singers, such as Nellie Melba, Franco Corelli and Luciano Pavarotti, as well as choirs have recorded it hundreds of times during the twentieth century.

Later in his career, Gounod composed an unrelated setting of Ave Maria for a four-part SATB choir.

Composition 

Gounod based the work on Bach's prelude, which is a study in harmony in broken chords. He used the first four measure for a prelude, repeating them for the first entry of the voice. He used Bach's composition, in the version with an inserted measure after the original 22, the so-called Schwencke-measure which was common at the time. To this measure, the voice has a repeated expressive "Maria!". He added a tempo marking, Moderato, pedal markings for the pianist, and dynamic markings.

Recordings 
Alessandro Moreschi, one of the last castrato singers, performed "Ave Maria" and several other pieces on recordings for the Gramophone & Typewriter Company in the early 1900s.

A rendition by Yo-Yo Ma and Bobby McFerrin was used as the main theme in the 2017 Palme d'Or winning Swedish film The Square.

Noa (Achinoam Nini) performed her own lyrics for "Ave Maria" for Pope John Paul II at the Vatican in 1994

The piece also features as a recurring theme during Disney's A Christmas Carol.

References

External links 
 
 Free sheet music for voice and piano on Cantorion.org
 
 

1859 compositions
Compositions by Charles Gounod
Arrangements of compositions by Johann Sebastian Bach
19th-century songs